A Ukrainophone (ukrainomovnyi) is a person who speaks the Ukrainian language either natively or by preference. At the same time the term is used in a more specialized meaning to describe the category of people whose cultural background is associated with the Ukrainian language regardless of territorial distinctions.

There are an estimated 41 million native speakers of Ukrainian worldwide (of whom 37.5 million or 91% live in Ukraine).

There are many Ukrainophone communities in neighbouring countries with Ukraine, due to the historical spread of ethnic Ukrainian populations in areas that later became a part of those states, including Belarus, Moldova (especially Transnistria), Poland, Hungary, Slovakia and Romania, as well as in continental nations and areas where Ukrainians had moved to in recent centuries or were deported to during the Soviet regime, such as Kazakhstan, the Far East, Sakhalin, Kuril Islands, Lithuania, Czech Republic, Germany, Italy, Croatia, Portugal, the U.K., etc. Additionally, there are large Ukrainophone immigrant communities in various parts of Canada, the United States (especially New York City, Baltimore) and Australia, and somewhat smaller communities in various nations of Latin America, such as Brazil, Argentina, Paraguay, and Venezuela.

Usage in Ukraine

Ukrainian vs. Russian
In  Ukraine almost all people are fluent in Ukrainian and it is taught to all children through the Ukrainian school system.  However, many people are also fluent in Russian, due to three centuries of forced Russification during the Russian Empire and then the Soviet Union, as well as waves of ethnic Russian migrations into Ukraine during Soviet rule. This is particularly true of ethnic Russians, members of other ethnic minority groups and residents of large cities in Central, Eastern and Southern Ukraine. Ukrainophones are in the majority in most of Western and Central Ukraine, and almost in all rural areas of Ukraine, including East Ukraine. In addition, people in areas influenced by the Russian language often speak a mixed form of Ukrainian known as Surzhyk, which uses a base of Ukrainian grammar but plugs in a lot of Ukrainianized Russian vocabulary into conversation.

Due to a significant lack of knowledge of Ukraine among Western journalists, which is often compounded by anti-Ukrainian propaganda coming from Russian media sources (which even led to boycotts of Russian media products in Ukraine), many of them have portrayed Russian and Ukrainian speakers as clearly defined and completely separate ethnic groups, each of which desires to exclusively dominate the Ukrainian state. The reality is that most people in Ukraine know both languages and frequently engage in language-switching as it suits them. Speaking Ukrainian or Russian in Ukraine is not regarded as a political statement, but merely a personal preference in a particular situation. For most Ukrainians, Russian and Ukrainian languages are interchangeable. Moreover, it is quite common for individuals to speak different languages to each other, as each person uses the language they are more comfortable with, without

Usage in the Ukrainian diaspora

Canada
In Canada the term Ukrainophone is also used to differentiate Ukrainian language-speakers from ethnically Ukrainian Canadians in general.  It refers to speakers of both the local Canadian Ukrainian dialect and Standard Ukrainian.

Most Ukrainian Canadians are assimilated to the North American majority and speak English.  In the nomenclature of Canadian and Quebec language politics this makes them Anglophones, but some Ukrainian Canadians may also be Francophones (French-speakers).  If Ukrainian is a person's mother tongue then they are considered "allophone" (neither English- nor French-speaking).  Therefore, a Ukrainophone in Quebec is also an allophone.

United States
The overwhelming majority of Ukrainophones in the United States reside in select areas of New York City and Baltimore, MA. In 2018 the number of Ukrainian diaspora in the US reached 1 million.

Brazil

Although most Brazilian Ukrainians have lived in Brazil for 4-5 generations and few have ever seen Ukraine, they have preserved their language and culture to a large degree in rural Paraná state. This has largely been due to the colossal efforts of the Ukrainian Churches. In contrast, among the Ukrainians in Argentina where the Church was not as strong as in Brazil, the Ukrainian language has largely disappeared. Among those who live in the colonies, or agricultural settlements, Ukrainian is widely spoken at home, in church, and in the community, and today it is not uncommon for Ukrainian children to be unable to speak the Portuguese language until they begin school. Despite the Ukrainian language's widespread use in everyday speech, the ability to read and write is more limited, with over 50% of the Ukrainian population being unable to write in the Ukrainian language. Due to isolation from Ukraine, the Ukrainians of Brazil speak a 100-year-old form of the language's Galician or "Upper Dniestrian" dialect. Ninety percent of Church services are conducted in the Ukrainian language (in contrast, among the 700,000 ethnic Poles in Brazil only two churches use the Polish language). The Portuguese language has only come into wide use in the youngest generation - those who are younger than fifteen years old. The situation in urban areas is quite different. In the cities, Ukrainians tend to become assimilated into Brazilian culture and to adopt the Portuguese language.

References

Language
Ukrainian diaspora

Ukrainian